Elizabeth Murray may refer to:

Elizabeth Murray,  Countess of Dysart in her own right and Duchess of Lauderdale by marriage (1626–1698), British noblewoman
Elizabeth Murray Campbell Smith Inman (1726–1785), shopkeeper, teacher, philanthropist, and proto-feminist
Elizabeth Murray (songwriter) (1745?–1814?), Scottish songwriter, married name Murray
Lady Elizabeth Murray (1760–1825), daughter of the 2nd Earl of Mansfield
Elizabeth Murray (painter) (1815–1882), English painter and author
Elizabeth Leigh Murray (1815–1892), English actress
Elizabeth Murray (artist) (1940–2007), American artist
Elizabeth Murray (doctor), British medical practitioner and academic
Liz Murray (born 1980), American inspirational speaker
Elizabeth Carey (social activist) (married name Elizabeth Murray, 1835–1920), Canadian co-founder of the Halifax Infants' Home and activist for the prevention of cruelty to animals.

See also
Elisabeth Murray